Georgetown is an unincorporated community in Stoney Creek Township, Randolph County, in the U.S. state of Indiana.

History
Georgetown was laid out in 1835. The town never amounted to much and by 1882 was described as "totally extinct".

Geography

References

Unincorporated communities in Randolph County, Indiana
Unincorporated communities in Indiana